Arvid Adolf Etholén, or Adolf Karlovich Etolin (9 January 1799, Helsinki – 29 March 1876, Elimäki) was a naval officer, explorer and administrator in the Russian Empire who was employed by the Russian-American Company from July 1818. He was a Swedish-speaking Finn, born in Helsinki in Swedish Finland. Etholén first reached Novoarkhangelsk (present-day Sitka, Alaska) in Russian America in the service of the Russian-American Company in 1818, rising to become Chief Manager of the Company between 1840 and 1845. ("Chief Manager" was a position sometimes referred to, though incorrectly, as "Governor").

Career
Etholén traveled from Russia to Russian America with Vasily Golovnin in the course of Golovnin's round-the-world voyage (1817-1819) on the Kamchatka. 's Baranov, Chief Manager of the Russian Colonies in America (1835), quotes Baranov: "If only the Main Office could have sent me men like yourselves earlier, then I would very likely have had more success, and I would have found it pleasant to pass the time in their company!".

Etholén transferred from the Imperial Russian Navy to the service of the Russian-American Company in July 1818. He served in the Pacific from 1818 to 1825 as ship's master, and was part of a group that surveyed the Bering Sea from 1822 to 1824. Having returned to European Russia in 1825, he re-joined the Russian-American Company in 1826, was appointed adjutant to the Chief Manager ("Governor") of Russian America in 1834, and became Chief Manager himself from 1840 to 1845. Etholén resigned from the Russian American Company in 1847 with the rank of Rear Admiral. He served as a member of the board of the Russian-American Company in Saint Petersburg, Russia from 1847 to 1859. Etholén was ennobled in 1856 and formally enrolled in the Finnish House of Nobility two years later, attending the Diet as a representative of the Nobility in 1863–76.

Adolf Etholén died at his estate in Elimäki, Finland, in 1876.

Legacy
The name Etolin, based on the Russian version of Etholén's name, can be found in several places on the map of Alaska.

Etolin Island was named after Etolin by the United States in the wake of the Alaska Purchase of 1867 (it was formerly the Duke of York's Island). There is also Etolin Strait, as well as a cape, a point and a mountain.

The Etholén collection (Etholén Alaskassa) in the National Museum of Finland contains a number of Alaskan ethnographic items.

References

External links
 100 Faces from Finland – a Biographical Kaleidoscope: Etholén, Arvid Adolf 
Etholén Alaska at Museovirasto 

1799 births
1876 deaths
Scandinavian explorers of North America
Explorers of Alaska
Finnish explorers
Finnish explorers of the Pacific
Governors of the Russian-American Company
Explorers from the Russian Empire
Russian people of Swedish descent
Swedish-speaking Finns